Carole Lavallée (January 23, 1954 – March 26, 2021) was a Canadian politician.

Lavallée was born in Montreal, Quebec. A businesswoman, communication consultant, communicator, and a journalist, she was first elected to the House of Commons of Canada in the 2004 Canadian federal election. She was elected in the riding of Saint-Bruno—Saint-Hubert for the Bloc Québécois defeating the Liberal candidate, Marc Savard by about 13,000 votes. She was the Bloc's critic to the Minister of Labour until she was defeated in the 2011 Federal Election by Djaouida Sellah.

References

External links
 

1954 births
2021 deaths
Bloc Québécois MPs
Businesspeople from Montreal
Journalists from Montreal
Members of the House of Commons of Canada from Quebec
Politicians from Montreal
Women in Quebec politics
Women members of the House of Commons of Canada
21st-century Canadian politicians
21st-century Canadian women politicians
French Quebecers